The northern caenolestid (Caenolestes convelatus), also known as the blackish shrew opossum, is a shrew opossum found in Colombia and Ecuador. It is listed as Vulnerable by the IUCN.

Taxonomy and etymology
The northern caenolestid is one of the five members of Caenolestes, and is placed in the family Caenolestidae (shrew opossums). It was first described by American zoologist Harold Elmer Anthony in 1924. In the latter part of 20th century, scientists believed that Caenolestes is closely related to Lestoros (the Incan caenolestid). Over the years, it became clear that Lestoros is morphologically different from Caenolestes. A 2013 morphological and mitochondrial DNA-based phylogenetic study showed that the Incan caenolestid and the long-nosed caenolestid (Rhyncholestes raphanurus) form a clade sister to Caenolestes. The cladogram below is based on this study.

Two subspecies are recognized:
C. c. barbarensis H. E. Anthony, 1924: Occurs in western Colombia
C. c. convelatus Bublitz, 1987: Occurs in northwestern Ecuador

Caenolestid fossils date to as early as the early Eocene (nearly 55 mya). The generic name Caenolestes derives from the Greek words kainos ("new") and lestes ("robber", "pirate").

Description
The northern caenolestid is similar to the gray-bellied caenolestid in coat coloration but differs in cranial features.Kirsch and Waller (1979) gave the following measurements for 1 adult male captured in Colombia in 1969: 

 Total length (mm) : 222
 Tail length (mm) : 114
 Hindfoot (mm) : 18
 Ear length (mm) : 14
 Weight (grams) : 25.0

Distribution and habitat
The northern caenolestid occurs in and around alpine and secondary forests. The populations appear to have been divided into two parts – the Andes of western Colombia and northcentral Ecuador. Deforestation is a major threat, and more severe in Ecuador.

References

External links

Shrew opossums
Mammals of the Andes
Marsupials of South America
Endemic fauna of Colombia
Endemic fauna of Ecuador
Mammals of Colombia
Mammals of Ecuador
Vulnerable animals
Vulnerable biota of South America
Mammals described in 1924
Taxonomy articles created by Polbot

es:Caenolestes#Caenolestes convelatus